Nasir Chinyoti (ناصر چنیوٹی) is a Pakistani actor and comedian from Chiniot. He started his acting career from Multan stage.  Nasir has starred in many stage dramas/telefilms in various languages including Urdu and Punjabi. He is the most notable for comedy stage dramas based in Lahore. He is famous for using improvised dialogues during stage plays.
Nasir Chinyoti has acted with many other comedians including Babu Baral, Sohail Ahmad, Iftikhar Thakur, Zafri Khan, Anwar Ali, Tariq Teddy, and Sakhawat Naz. He previously used to appear in Khabarnaak comedy show in various satires on Geo News (Pakistan). He is rated as one of the best comedians in Pakistan. He appeared in Khabaryar comedy show on Neo News where he played many of the most appreciated roles. Subsequently, he also worked for Khabardar on Express News. Currently, he is doing a show called Khabarhar on Samaa News, hosted by Aftab Iqbal.

Filmography

TV Shows 
 Family Front (1997)
Khabarnaak (2010)
 Khabardaar (2015–2018)
 Khabarzar (2018–2020)
 Khabaryar (2020–2021)
Khabardaar (2021-2022)
Khabarhar (2022-2022)
 Masityan (2023-present)

References

External links
 

Living people
Punjabi people
People from Chiniot District
Male actors from Lahore
Pakistani male television actors
Pakistani male stage actors
Pakistani stand-up comedians
Pakistani theatre directors
1970 births